The Port of Huntsville is an inland port located in Huntsville, Alabama that consists of the:

 Huntsville International Airport
 International Intermodal Center
 Jetplex Industrial Park

External links
Official site

Economy of Huntsville, Alabama
Buildings and structures in Madison County, Alabama
Transportation in Madison County, Alabama